Dan Seymour (February 22, 1915 – May 25, 1993) was an American character actor who frequently played villains in Warner Bros. films.  He appeared in several Humphrey Bogart films, including Casablanca (1942), To Have and Have Not (1944) and Key Largo (1948).

He should not be confused with the Dan Seymour who was the announcer of Orson Welles' Halloween broadcast of The War of the Worlds and other radio programs.

Early life

He was born Daniel Seymour Katz in Chicago, Illinois.  He attended Senn High School in Chicago and graduated from the University of Chicago with a B.S. in Fine Arts.

Career

Seymour worked in burlesque as a song-and-dance man and worked at night as an emcee in New York night clubs. He moved to Hollywood, where his large build made him suitable casting for roles as dubious characters. After 16 months of dieting and swimming, his weight dropped to 244 pounds in 1946 having lost 100 pounds.

He played Vichy French Captain Renard, in To Have and Have Not (1944), the adversary of Humphrey Bogart's character. In Key Largo (1948), he again played opposite Bogart as one of the henchmen of Johnny Rocco (Edward G. Robinson).  In the motion picture Mara Maru (1952), he played opposite Raymond Burr and Errol Flynn.

He later appeared in seven episodes of Perry Mason, which starred Burr; the episodes spanned the entire nine-year run of the popular series. During the first season in 1957, he played Harry Marlow in "The Case of the Silent Partner." In the final season in 1965, he played Nappy Tyler in "The Case of the Carefree Coronary." He made four appearances in The Untouchables, and three on Adventures of Superman. He performed on the radio anthology series Mollé Mystery Theatre and later on many television series. He acted in episodes 25 and 26 of Batman (1966) credited as "Dan Seymore".

Personal life
He married Evelyn Schwartz in 1949. They had two children: Jeff, born in 1950, and Greg, born in 1954.

Death 
On May 25, 1993, Seymour died two months after suffering a stroke in Santa Monica, California. He was buried at Hillside Memorial Park in Culver City, California.

Partial filmography

 Bombs over Burma (1942) - Pete Brogranza
 Cairo (1942) - Fat Doorman in Cairo Theatre (uncredited)
 The Talk of the Town (1942) - Headwaiter at Nightclub (uncredited)
 Road to Morocco (1942) - Slave-Buyer (uncredited)
 Casablanca (1942) - Abdul (uncredited)
 Mug Town (1942) - Chef (uncredited)
 Tahiti Honey (1943) - Fats
 Rhythm of the Islands (1943) - Native Guard
 Hit the Ice (1943) - Resort Chef (uncredited)
 Tiger Fangs (1943) - Henry Gratz
 Klondike Kate (1943) - Harry - Piano Player
 Kismet (1944) - Fat Turk at the Cafe (uncredited)
 Rainbow Island (1944) - Fat Native Man (uncredited)
 To Have and Have Not (1944) - Capt. M. Renard
 Brazil (1944) - King of the Carnival (uncredited)
 It's in the Bag! (1945) - Fatso (uncredited)
 Guest Wife (1945) - Turkish customer (uncredited)
 The Spanish Main (1945) - Jailer (uncredited)
 Confidential Agent (1945) - Mr. Muckerji
 San Antonio (1945) - Laredo Border Guard (uncredited)
 A Night in Casablanca (1946) - Prefect of Police
 The Searching Wind (1946) - Torrone
 Cloak and Dagger (1946) - Marsoli
 Philo Vance's Gamble (1947) - Jeffrey Connor
 Hard Boiled Mahoney (1947) - Dr. Armand
 Slave Girl (1947) - Telek - Tuareg Chieftain
 Intrigue (1947) - Karidian
 Key Largo (1948) - Angel Garcia
 Johnny Belinda (1948) - Pacquet - Storekeeper
 Highway 13 (1948) - Kelleher (uncredited)
 Trail of the Yukon (1949) - Tom Laroux
 Reign of Terror (1949) - Innkeeper (uncredited)
 Young Man with a Horn (1950) - Mike (uncredited)
 Abbott and Costello in the Foreign Legion (1950) - Josef (uncredited)
 Joe Palooka in the Squared Circle (1950) - Charlie Crawford
 Sirocco (1951) -  Wealthy Syrian (uncredited)
 The Blue Veil (1951) - Pelt
 Rancho Notorious (1952) - Comanche Paul
 Mara Maru (1952) - Lt. Zuenon
 Glory Alley (1952) - Sal Nichols (The Pig)
 Face to Face (1952) - Drummer ('The Bride Comes to Yellow Sky')
 Tangier Incident (1953) - Police Inspector Rabat
 The System (1953) - Mr. Marty
 Second Chance (1953) - Felipe
 The Big Heat (1953) - Mr. Atkins
 Human Desire (1954) - Duggan - Bartender (uncredited)
 Abbott and Costello Meet the Mummy (1955) - Josef
 Moonfleet (1955) - Hull
 Beyond a Reasonable Doubt (1956) - Greco
 The Buster Keaton Story (1957) - Indian Chief
 Undersea Girl (1957) - Police Lt. Mike Travis
 The Sad Sack (1957) - Arab Chieftain (uncredited)
 Watusi (1959) - Mohamet
 Return of the Fly (1959) - Max Barthold
 Unholy Rollers (1972) - Used Car Dealer
 The Way We Were (1973) - Guest
 Centerfold Girls (1974) - Proprietor
 The Manhandlers (1974) - Vito
 Escape to Witch Mountain (1975) - Psychic

References

External links 

 
 
 Dan Seymour at Turner Classic Movies
 
 

1915 births
1993 deaths
American male film actors
Jewish American male actors
American male television actors
20th-century American male actors
Burials at Hillside Memorial Park Cemetery
20th-century American Jews